Nobody's Children (Italian:I figli di nessuno) is a 1951 French-Italian melodrama film directed by Raffaello Matarazzo and starring Amedeo Nazzari, Yvonne Sanson and Françoise Rosay. It is one of a series of melodramas co-starring Nazzari and Sanson, which were very popular at the box office. The owner of a marble quarry falls in love with the daughter with one of his employees, and they have a baby together. However his mother attempts to sabotage the relationship with tragic consequences.

It was followed by a 1955 sequel, The White Angel.

Cast
 Amedeo Nazzari: Guido Canali
 Yvonne Sanson: Luisa Fanti / Suor Addolorata
 Françoise Rosay: Contessa Canali
 Folco Lulli: Anselmo Vannini
 Enrica Dyrell: Elena
 Teresa Franchini: Marta
 Gualtiero Tumiati: Padre Demetrio
 Alberto Farnese: Poldo
 Aristide Baghetti: Bernardo Fanti, padre di Luisa
 Enrico Glori: Rinaldi
 Olga Solbelli: Madre Superiora
 Nino Marchesini: il dottore
 Rita Livesi: la suora
 Giulio Tomasini: Antonio
 Enrico Olivieri: Bruno
 Rosalia Randazzo: Alda
 Felice Minotti: custode
 Loris Gizzi: direttore del collegio

References

Bibliography 
 Moliterno, Gino. The A to Z of Italian Cinema. Scarecrow Press, 2009.

External links
 

1951 films
1951 drama films
French drama films
Italian drama films
1950s Italian-language films
Films set in Tuscany
Films directed by Raffaello Matarazzo
Melodrama films
French black-and-white films
Italian black-and-white films
1950s Italian films
1950s French films